Eleutherodactylus cubanus is a species of frog in the family Eleutherodactylidae found in Cuba.
Its natural habitats are tropical moist montane forest. It is threatened by habitat loss.

References

cubanus
Endemic fauna of Cuba
Amphibians of Cuba
Amphibians described in 1937
Taxonomy articles created by Polbot
Taxa named by Thomas Barbour
Taxa named by Benjamin Shreve